Scotty's Little Soldiers is a British charity supporting children whose parents have died while serving in the armed forces. It was founded in 2010 by Mrs Nikki Scott after her husband Corporal Lee "Scotty" Scott was killed in 2009 while on active service in Afghanistan with the 2nd Royal Tank Regiment.

The charity supports children and young people who have lost a parent while they were serving in the regular or reserve army, navy or air force, whether on active service or through accident or illness, and including those medically discharged before their death. It provides three programmes of support: "Smiles" offers outings and gifts; "Support" helps with counselling and family support; and "Strides" offers grants and assistance for education and personal development.

In 2013 a match between teams representing the charity and the armed forces claimed a world  record for the longest rugby union football match ever, at 24 hours 50 minutes.

In 2014 Tesco introduced a range of children's clothes based on the charity's logo.

It was one of the seven charities nominated by Prince Harry and Meghan Markle to receive donations in lieu of wedding presents when the couple married on 19 May 2018.

References

External links

Children's charities based in England